The angulated dwarf gecko (Lygodactylus angularis) is a species of gecko native to southern Zaire and Tanzania. The Zairean subspecies is Lygodactylus angularis grzimek, and the Tanzanian subspecies is Lygodactylus angularis heeneni.

References
https://web.archive.org/web/20070929013959/http://www.zooinstitutes.com/Zoology/continents.asp?name=AFRICA

Lygodactylus
Reptiles described in 1893
Taxa named by Albert Günther